The Holywell Music Room is the city of Oxford's chamber music hall, situated on Holywell Street in the city centre, and is part of Wadham College. It is said to be the oldest purpose-built music room in Europe, and hence Britain's first concert hall.

History
The Holywell Music Room, which is part of Wadham College, Oxford, was one of the earliest purpose built concert venues in the world and the first in Europe. Prior to the advent of concert halls, recitals would happen at private aristocratic venues, royal courts, or in churches.
It was built in 1748, probably under the direction of William Hayes and it was designed by Dr Thomas Camplin, the vice-principal of St Edmund Hall.  The venue was important for popularizing the music of Haydn in 18th century England. He was the most frequently performed composer during 1788–1791; at short notice he was unable to attend a planned visit to the venue while in Oxford in 1791.

By 1836, the building was being used for purposes beyond concerts, including auctions and exhibitions. During the 1870s, the Oxford Philharmonic Society would give weekly concerns. In 1910, the building was leased by the Oxford University Musical Union. In 1959, the building was restored. The building was Grade II* listed in 1954.

Building
The building cost £1,263 and 10s, equivalent to approximately £2.5 million in 2018, and included chandeliers that had previously been hung in Westminster Hall for Coronation of George IV and donated to Wadham College. The building was funded by public subscription. The auditorium seats 200, includes an organ, which likely dates from the 1800s and originated in Holland. The room is the venue for a wide variety of music performances.

See also 
 Sheldonian Theatre
 Jacqueline Du Pré Music Building

Notes

References

External links 
 
 University of Oxford Faculty of Music
 Pindrop Performances
 Oxford Chamber Music Society
 Oxford Coffee Concerts
 Jack Gibbons concerts in Oxford
 Information from Daily Information
 Appeal for the extension and renovation of the Holywell Music Room

Music venues completed in 1748
Music venues in Oxfordshire
Concert halls in England